Robert J. Stewart (16 February 1877 – 1971) was a  member of the Communist Party of Great Britain (CPGB) and was in charge of the underground cell which, in the 1930s, operated a clandestine transmitter in Wimbledon that relayed information between the CPGB and the Comintern in Moscow. He was the CPGB's spymaster and, at one stage, controlled the Cambridge Five.

Biography
Stewart was born in Eassie, Angus, in Scotland, but grew up in Dundee.  Stewart trained as a ship's carpenter from the age of twelve. He joined the Amalgamated Association of Carpenters and Joiners and was soon elected to the local management committee.

In the early 20th century Stewart moved to South Africa, but returned to Dundee to become the full-time organizer of the Scottish Prohibition Party. In 1908, he was elected to the town council, but he soon led a Marxist and anti-religious split, the Prohibition and Reform Party. In 1911, he became the full-time organizer of this organization.

During the 1910s, Stewart worked as an organizer for the Scottish Horse and Motormen's Union and then the No Conscription Fellowship.  He was imprisoned for opposition to World War I, then served in the British Army from 1917 to 1919.  In these two years, he was court-martialed four times.

Stewart's party restarted activity after he was released. In his autobiography he claimed it was renamed the Socialist Prohibition and Reform Party, but there is no documentary evidence to support this. He began working with the Communist Unity Group and was a founder member of the CPGB, serving on its first Executive Committee. He stood for the party in the Dundee Town Council election in June 1921, polling 6,160 votes, and two months later in a by-election at Caerphilly. In 1922, he was appointed as the party's Scottish organizer, but was imprisoned for six months for sedition.

In 1923, Stewart went to work for the Comintern in Moscow, but stood in Dundee at the 1924, 1929 and 1931 general elections - in 1931, he took 10,261 votes. In 1925 he served as Acting General Secretary of the party, while the rest of the party leadership were in prison.

Stewart remained on the party's Executive Committee until 1936, when he became secretary of the Control Commission, the party's disciplinary body.

Stewart moved to Moscow in early 1923 to work at Comintern headquarters. While there, he met several key Soviet leaders and attended Lenin’s funeral. He was sent by the Comintern to many parts of Europe, because his British passport enabled him to travel at will. In 1924, he was sent to Ireland to assist in the creation of a Communist Party there, which led to the creation of the Revolutionary Workers' Groups and eventual re-establishment of the Communist Party of Ireland in 1933.

As the British representative on Comintern, Stewart attracted considerable attention from the British authorities. The three volumes of Bob Stewart's MI5 file open in September 1920 with a report from SIS that identified him as a Communist and 'a secret agent for England on behalf of the Third International'.

Files on him are available in the National Archives at Kew. One of the bundles, covering the period 1927-31, covers Stewart's contacts with Norwegian and Chinese communists in 1927. It also includes reports from an informant in Ireland about Stewart's  activities there, including, in 1929-1930, contacts between the Irish Republican Army and the CPGB.

He published an account of his work, Breaking the Fetters, in 1967.

References

1877 births
1971 deaths
British spies for the Soviet Union
British temperance activists
Communist Party of Great Britain members
People associated with Dundee
Scottish communists
Scottish trade unionists
Councillors in Dundee